Lordsburg station is an Amtrak train station located at Center Street and East Motel Drive, on the south side of the tracks, in Lordsburg, New Mexico, United States.

The wooden clapboard station building has been demolished once at the site has been demolished. It has since been replaced with a simple metal shelter with a bench inside (sometimes derisively called an "Amshack") with train information posted on a sign outside. There is no platform at this station, trains stop at a paved vehicle crossing where passengers board.

References

External links 

Lordsburg, NM – Texas Eagle (Amtrak)
Lordsburg Amtrak Station (USA Rail Guide -- Train Web)

Amtrak stations in New Mexico
Buildings and structures in Hidalgo County, New Mexico
Transportation in Hidalgo County, New Mexico
Former Southern Pacific Railroad stations